Coatings is a compilation album by English rock band Wire. It was released on 21 October 1997 which compiles studio recordings from the band's second era (1985–90) that appeared only as B-sides, alternate mixes, bonus tracks previously unavailable in the UK and several Peel Session tracks.

Track listing

References

External links 

 

Wire (band) compilation albums
1997 compilation albums